The Moses Goldsmith Building is a historic residence in Cincinnati, Ohio, United States.  Built in 1900, it was originally owned by Moses Goldsmith, the president of a firm that sold notions; rather than living in the house, Goldsmith built it for investment purposes, renting it to others.

A brick house with elements of sandstone and limestone, the Goldsmith Building has been ranked as a fine example of Renaissance Revival architecture.  Distinctive elements of its design include prominent string courses and molding courses, plus a large loggia.

The Goldsmith Building was erected in the Clifton neighborhood at a time when that neighborhood was expanding greatly.  Large numbers of prosperous members of Cincinnati society built grand homes in the neighborhood, making it a highly distinctive portion of the city.  The house did not long stay in the Goldsmith family; Moses died within a few years of its construction, and his heirs sold the property in 1912.  After Goldsmith's time, it was converted from a single-family residence to a multi-family residence.  In 1982, the Goldsmith Building was listed on the National Register of Historic Places, due to its historically significant architecture; key to this designation was its loggia, which is almost unknown in Cincinnati.

References

1900s architecture in the United States
Houses completed in 1900
Houses in Cincinnati
Houses on the National Register of Historic Places in Ohio
National Register of Historic Places in Cincinnati
Renaissance Revival architecture in Ohio
Loggias